The Daily Manab Zamin ( "People's Land") is a major daily tabloid newspaper in Bangladesh, published from Dhaka in the Bengali language. It is the first and largest circulated Bengali tabloid daily in the world, with 19,000,000 monthly pageviews on its online edition. 1.6 million visitors from 189 countries from all over the planet visit the web site every month, making it one of the most visited Bengali-language online publications worldwide. It is ranked within the World Top 500 newspaper web sites of the world, and is in the top 1% of all sites globally. The newspaper is also the only Bangladeshi publication to boast credentials and affiliations with FIFA, UEFA, and the English Premier League. It has also partnered with Sony Pictures and Warner Bros. in publicity for Hollywood productions, including Batman Begins, Superman Returns and Casino Royale.

The Daily Manab Zamin is also the only Bangladeshi newspaper to host a dedicated website for the 2010 FIFA World Cup in South Africa with detailed updates, player profiles, team stats, and all the latest gossip. The website is ranked 15 in Bangladesh, and is one of the fastest growing news outlets in the country. It now stands in second place in Bengali-language newspaper websites, and in the Top 5 Bengali news sites in the World.

See also
 List of newspapers in Bangladesh

References

External links

 
 
 

Bengali-language newspapers published in Bangladesh
Daily newspapers published in Bangladesh
Newspapers published in Dhaka
1997 establishments in Bangladesh
Newspapers established in 1997